James Whitfield may refer to:

 James Whitfield (bishop) (1770–1834), Roman Catholic Bishop of Baltimore, 1828–1834
 James Whitfield (Mississippi politician) (1791–1875), Governor of Mississippi, 1858–1859
 James B. Whitfield (1860–1948), Florida lawyer and justice of the Florida Supreme Court
 James Monroe Whitfield (1822–1871), African American poet, abolitionist and political activist
 James Whitfield, principal of Colleyville Heritage High School

See also
 Jimmy Whitfield (1919–1984), English footballer